Youth Speaks Hawaii (YSH) is a program of Hawai'i nonprofit Pacific Tongues. Founded in January 2005, the organization focuses on promoting teen literacy and civic engagement through the writing and performance of spoken word slam poetry. YSH runs weekly workshops with mentors from throughout the Hawaii poetry slam community, and special guest mentors, which are open for all interested students to write, read, and discuss poetry and performance.

Since its creation Youth Speaks Hawaii has participated in the annual Brave New Voices, the international championship for Youth Speaks, by sending a team of up to six poets to each event. In the 2007 Brave New Voices championship, held in San Jose, California, YSH placed 7th among the 35 teams. Preceding the 2008 event, held in Washington DC, YSH was chosen as one of the teams featured in HBO's series "Russell Simmons Presents: Brave New Voices." Hawaii finished first in that year's event, the eleventh and largest to date. The following year at the event held in Chicago, Illinois, with a total of 50 teams competing, Hawaii repeated as champions.

Youth Speaks Hawaii mentors, including poets from the Hawaii Slam Team and YSH alumni, offer a weekly workshop as well as special programs at several schools throughout Oahu. Beginning in April 2010 YSH also runs a monthly slam every second Saturday (entitled 2nd SATurdays) at 1159 Nuuanu Avenue in Honolulu.

References

Youth organizations based in Hawaii
Poetry organizations
Slam poetry
2005 establishments in Hawaii
Organizations established in 2005